Hathor 24 - Coptic Calendar - Hathor 26

The twenty-fifth day of the Coptic month of Hathor, the third month of the Coptic year. On a common year, this day corresponds to November 21, of the Julian Calendar, and December 4, of the Gregorian Calendar. This day falls in the Coptic season of Peret, the season of emergence. This day falls in the Nativity Fast.

Commemorations

Saints 

 The martyrdom of Saint Philopater Mercurius, known as "The One with Two Swords"

References 

Days of the Coptic calendar